Saint-Nazaire (Provençal: Sent Nazari) is a commune in the Gard department in southern France.

Population

See also
Communes of the Gard department

References

Communes of Gard